Zhou Haibin (born 19 July 1985) is a retired Chinese professional footballer who spent the majority of his playing career at Chinese Super League club Shandong Luneng.

Club career

Early career
In October 1999, Zhou Haibin joined Shandong Luneng's youth academy at age 14 and was a standout player for the youth sides. Zhou broke into the first team, after impressing in the youth academy, in the 2003 season and became a regular for Shandong. He scored his first goal for the club on 31 July 2003 in a league game with Shenyang Ginde.

PSV Eindhoven
Zhou joined Eredivisie side PSV Eindhoven in February 2009 on a free transfer from Shandong Luneng. There were some issues however between PSV Eindhoven and the KNVB on one side and the Chinese Football Association on the other, the latter having the right to hold released players for 30 more months. However, on 7 February 2009, PSV Eindhoven officially confirmed the capture of Zhou on a free transfer. He signed a one-year contract with an option for a further two and half-year extension. On 7 October 2009, then manager Fred Rutten announced in an interview with Algemeen Dagblad that the club would not extend Zhou's contract at the end of his current deal and Zhou was officially released on 28 December 2009.

Shandong Luneng
On 10 January 2010, Zhou returned to his homeland by signing with former club Chinese Super League side Shandong Luneng again. During the 2012 season, Zhou had a disappointing year for Shandong as he lost his starting spot and only played six games the whole season.

Tianjin Teda
On 17 July 2013, Shandong Luneng confirmed that Zhou was loaned out to fellow Chinese Super League side Tianjin Teda for six months. He permanently transferred to the club at the beginning of the 2013 season after the successful loan spell. He made his debut for the club after his permanent transfer in a 1–1 draw against Guangzhou R&F on 9 March 2014. He scored his first goal for the club after permanently transferring to them on 11 April 2014 in a 5–2 loss to Guangzhou Evergrande.

Shandong Luneng
On 8 January 2017, Zhou returned to Shandong Luneng.

International career
On 1 June 2004, Zhou became the youngest player ever to score for the Chinese national team in a 2–1 win against Hungary.

Career statistics

Club statistics

International goals
Results list China's goal tally first.

Honours

Club
Shandong Luneng
Chinese Super League: 2006, 2008, 2010
Chinese FA Cup: 2004, 2006
Chinese Super League Cup: 2004

International
China PR
East Asian Football Championship: 2005

References

External links
 
 

1985 births
Living people
Chinese footballers
Chinese expatriate footballers
China international footballers
Footballers from Dalian
Association football midfielders
2004 AFC Asian Cup players
2007 AFC Asian Cup players
Footballers at the 2008 Summer Olympics
2011 AFC Asian Cup players
Olympic footballers of China
PSV Eindhoven players
Shandong Taishan F.C. players
Tianjin Jinmen Tiger F.C. players
Chinese Super League players
Footballers at the 2006 Asian Games
Asian Games competitors for China